Pseudohercostomus is a genus of flies in the family Dolichopodidae. It is distributed in the Oriental and Afrotropical realms as well as Chile.

Historically, the genus has generally been placed in the subfamily Dolichopodinae. In 2005, based on a cladistic analysis of the subfamily, Scott E. Brooks excluded Pseudohercostomus from the Dolichopodinae. The systematic position of the genus is still unclear, though a possible relationship with the New World genus Keirosoma has been suggested.

Species
The genus contains five species:
 Pseudohercostomus allini Negrobov, 1988 – Chile
 Pseudohercostomus congoensis Grootaert & Van de Velde, 2021 – DR Congo; Mozambique
 Pseudohercostomus echinatus Stackelberg, 1931 – Java, Indonesia
 Pseudohercostomus sinensis Yang & Grootaert, 1999 – China (Yunnan)
 Pseudohercostomus singaporensis Grootaert & Van de Velde, 2021 – Singapore; Cambodia

References

Dolichopodidae
Dolichopodidae genera
Taxa named by Aleksandr Stackelberg
Diptera of Asia
Diptera of Africa
Diptera of South America